Harold James Peacock (27 August 1897 – 5 September 1987) was an Australian rules footballer who played with St Kilda in the Victorian Football League (VFL).

Notes

External links 

1897 births
1987 deaths
Australian rules footballers from Victoria (Australia)
St Kilda Football Club players
Werribee Football Club players